Derby's dose was a form of torture used in Jamaica to punish slaves who attempted to escape or committed other offenses like stealing food on plantations that were owned or ran by Thomas Thistlewood. According to Malcolm Gladwell in his 2008 book Outliers, (Thomas Thistlewood wrote about his outlandish behaviour and disturbing treatment of Jamaican slaves extensively in his 14,000 page diary) "The runaway would be beaten, and salt pickle, lime juice, and bird pepper would be rubbed into his or her open wounds. Another slave would defecate into the mouth of the miscreant, who would then be gagged, with their mouth full, for four to five hours." The punishment was invented by Thomas Thistlewood, a slave overseer, and named after the slave, Derby, who was made to undergo this punishment when he was caught eating young sugar cane stalks in the field on 25 May 1756. However, historian Douglas Hall points out that "Derby's dose" was so-called because it was often administered by one of his slaves called Derby. 

Thistlewood recorded this punishment as well as a further punishment of Derby in August of that same year in his diary. 

On 18 November 2013 British television host Martin Bashir discredited a comparison made by U.S. politician Sarah Palin between the United States' debt to China and slavery by referring to Derby's dose. In pointing out how cruel and barbaric slavery was, Bashir used Derby's dose as an example; at the end of the segment, he finished by saying that "if anyone truly qualified for a dose of discipline from Thomas Thistlewood, [Palin] would be the outstanding candidate". He was criticized for this comment, and ultimately resigned.

References

Feces
Slavery in Jamaica
Torture